Lukáš Beňo (born 7 November 1989) is a Slovak footballer who plays as a defender for the Slovakia club Dubnica.

External links
 
  MFK Dubnica 

1989 births
Living people
People from Ilava
Sportspeople from the Trenčín Region
Slovak footballers
Association football defenders
FK Dubnica players
FC DAC 1904 Dunajská Streda players
Spartak Myjava players
AFC Nové Mesto nad Váhom players
Slovak Super Liga players